Proton computed tomography (pCT), or proton CT, is an imaging modality first proposed by Cormack in 1963  and initial experiment explorations identified several advantages over conventional X-ray CT (xCT).  However, particle interactions such as multiple Coulomb scattering (MCS) and (in)elastic nuclear scattering events deflect the proton trajectory, resulting in nonlinear paths which can only be approximated via statistical assumptions, leading to lower spatial resolution than X-ray tomography.  Further experiments were largely abandoned until the advent of proton radiation therapy in the 1990s which renewed interest in the topic due to the potential benefits of imaging and treating patients with the same particle.

Description
Proton computed tomography (pCT) uses measurements of a proton's position/trajectory and energy before and after traversing an object to reconstruct an image of the object where each voxel represents the relative stopping power (RSP) of the material composition of the corresponding region of the object.  The deviations of a proton's path inside the object are primarily due to interactions between the Coulomb fields of the proton and the nuclei in the absorbing material, resulting in many small-angle deflections as it passes through the object.  Statistical models of the effect of MCS on the trajectory of a proton were developed to calculate the most likely path (MLP) of a proton given its entry and exit position/trajectory and corresponding uncertainty at intermediate depths within the object.  Additional (in)elastic nuclear scattering events can also occur which cause larger angle deviations, which cannot easily be modeled, but these are fairly easy to identify and remove from consideration in the image reconstruction process.

With an approximate path of a proton through the object, one can then identify the voxels through which the proton passed, and the difference between entry and exit energy indicates the energy collectively deposited in these voxels.  Assuming there are  voxels in the image, the distance, the proton travels through each voxel  varies along the path and the amount of energy deposited in each voxel, depends on this and the voxel's RSP, .  The total energy loss  is the line integral of RSP scaled by the intersection length, or

References

Further reading
 

 
 "Use of Protons for Radiotherapy", A.M. Koehler, Proc. of the Symposium on Pion and Proton Radiotherapy, Nat. Accelerator Lab., (1971).
 
 "Bragg Peak Proton Radiosurgery for Arteriovenous Malformation of the Brain" R.N. Kjelberg, presented at First Int. Seminar on the Use of Proton Beams in Radiation Therapy, Moscow (1977).
 Austin-Seymor, M.J. Munzenrider, et al. "Fractionated Proton Radiation Therapy of Cranial and Intracrainial Tumors" American Journal of Clinical Oncology 13(4):327–330 (1990).
 "Proton Radiotherapy", Hartford, Zietman, et al. in Radiotheraputic Management of Carcinoma of the Prostate, A. D'Amico and G.E. Hanks. London, UK, Arnold Publishers: 61–72 (1999).

External links

 Proton therapy—MedlinePlus Medical Encyclopedia
 Proton Therapy
 "Proton therapy is coming to the UK, but what does it mean for patients?", Arney, Kat, Science blog, Cancer Research UK, 16 September 2013

Radiation therapy
Medical physics
Proton